Sudhakar Komakula is an Indian actor who works in Telugu cinema. He made his debut in the film Life Is Beautiful (2012).

Career 
Sudhkar Komakula was a part of a dance group in Visakhapatnam. He bagged a role in Manasutho (2002) when the music director of the film, Ashirvad Luke, introduced him to the makers of the film. He shared screen space with Brahmanandam in the film and later played a supporting role in Oka V Chitram (2006). However, both of these films failed to provide the actor a big break. He received a breakthrough with Sekhar Kammula's coming of age film Life is Beautiful (2012). He garnered acclaim for his character's Telangana accent. After the success of the film, he went on to act in several films including the thriller Hang Up! (2014), the romantic drama Vundile Manchi Kalam Mundu Munduna (2014), the romantic comedy Kundanapu Bomma (2016), and the romantic, action drama film  Nuvvu Thopu Raa (2019) in which he used a Telangana accent again.

He turned singer for Nuvvu Thopu Raa.

Filmography

References

External links 

Living people
Male actors in Telugu cinema
21st-century Indian male actors
Indian male film actors
Indian male dancers
Telugu playback singers
Year of birth missing (living people)
Telugu male actors